Matthew Sean O'Riley (born 21 November 2000) is a Danish-English professional footballer who plays as a midfielder for Scottish Premiership club Celtic. Born in England, he is an under-21 international for Denmark.

Club career

Fulham
O'Riley joined the academy of Fulham at the age of eight, having previously played for Teddington-based NPL Youth. He progressed through several age groups, eventually becoming a regular in the club's U18 and reserve sides. He made his first team debut on 8 August 2017 in a 2–0 EFL Cup first round away win over Wycombe Wanderers. 

Over the next two seasons O'Riley featured for the club's U21 side in several EFL Trophy group matches whilst on the fringes of the first team. He made his Championship debut on 1 January 2020 as a 19th-minute substitute in a 2–1 home defeat to Reading. O'Riley left the club in the summer of 2020, having declined a new three-year first team deal amidst rumoured interest from several clubs domestically and abroad.

Milton Keynes Dons
On 24 January 2021, O'Riley signed for League One club Milton Keynes Dons, having spent six months training with the side as a free agent since leaving Fulham. Less than a week after joining, on 30 January 2021, he scored his first professional career goal. 

After an impressive start to the 2021–22 season, on 11 December 2021 O'Riley was named EFL Young Player of the Month for November 2021, a month in which he scored four goals in as many appearances.

Celtic
On 20 January 2022, O'Riley joined Scottish Premiership club Celtic on a four-and-a-half year deal for a reported £1,500,000 fee after the club met his release clause. He made his debut on 26 January 2022, starting in a 2–1 away win over Hearts. On 9 February 2022, O'Riley scored his first goal for the club in a 3–2 away victory over Aberdeen. On 9 April 2022 he scored a brace in a 7–0 home win over St Johnstone. O'Riley would help Celtic lift the 2021–22 Scottish Premiership that year.

On 6 September 2022, O'Riley made his UEFA Champions League debut in a 3-0 home defeat against Real Madrid.

International career
O'Riley was an England youth international. As well as England, he is eligible to represent Ireland, Denmark and Norway due to his mother's side of the family. In February 2022, O'Riley declared his interest in representing Denmark internationally when he stated that: "I played for England youth teams but at the same time, I do feel quite Danish. My mum is Danish and I can speak a decent amount and I can understand a very good amount. In that sense, I don't think it is out of the question at all. If I did get a call up from Denmark, I don't think I'd be saying no". 

In March 2022, O'Riley was called up to the Denmark under-21s for the first time. On 14 June 2022, O'Riley scored his first goal for Denmark against the Turkey under-21s in a UEFA European Under-21 Championship qualifying match - which Denmark won 3-2.

Career statistics

Honours
Celtic
Scottish Premiership: 2021–22
Scottish League Cup: 2022–23

Individual
 EFL Young Player of the Month: November 2021
 Scottish Premiership Goal of the Month: April 2022

References

External links
England profile at The Football Association

2000 births
Living people
Footballers from Hounslow
Danish men's footballers
Denmark under-21 international footballers
English footballers
England youth international footballers
Danish people of English descent
Danish people of Norwegian descent
Danish people of Irish descent
English people of Danish descent
English people of Norwegian descent
English people of Irish descent
Fulham F.C. players
Milton Keynes Dons F.C. players
Celtic F.C. players
Association football midfielders
English Football League players
Scottish Professional Football League players